Riccardo Dei Rossi (born 6 February 1969 in Trieste) is an Italian rower.

References 
 
 

1969 births
Living people
Italian male rowers
Sportspeople from Trieste
Rowers at the 1992 Summer Olympics
Rowers at the 1996 Summer Olympics
Rowers at the 2000 Summer Olympics
Olympic silver medalists for Italy
Olympic rowers of Italy
Olympic medalists in rowing
World Rowing Championships medalists for Italy
Medalists at the 2000 Summer Olympics